Suki Dakara may refer to:
 "Suki Dakara" (Becky song)
 "Suki Dakara" (Beni song)